Kappel am Krappfeld is a town in the district of Sankt Veit an der Glan in the Austrian state of Carinthia. It is the birthplace of Maria Lassnig.

Geography
Kappel lies about 25 km northeast of Klagenfurt. Neighboring municipalities from the north clockwise are Althofen, Guttaring, Klein Sankt Paul, Eberstein, Sankt Georgen am Längsee, and Mölbling.

References 

Cities and towns in Sankt Veit an der Glan District